Tuapi is a small indigenous community in the municipality of Puerto Cabezas in the North Caribbean Coast Autonomous Region of Nicaragua.

References 

Populated places in Nicaragua
North Caribbean Coast Autonomous Region